Sham Lal (born 1938) is an Indian gymnast. He competed in seven events at the 1956 Summer Olympics. He became first Indian to win the Arjuna Award in 1961 for gymnastics.

References

1938 births
Living people
Indian male artistic gymnasts
Olympic gymnasts of India
Gymnasts at the 1956 Summer Olympics
Place of birth missing (living people)
Recipients of the Arjuna Award